Saint John is a civil parish of Antigua and Barbuda, located on the island of Antigua. It is the most populous parish of Antigua and Barbuda, with a population of 51,737 in 2011, and an estimated population of 56,736 in 2018. The plurality of the population of the parish is located within the country’s capital, St. John’s.

Boon Point, the northernmost point of Antigua, is located in Saint John.

The parish annexed Redonda in 1872.

Saint John coincides with the boundaries of District "A".

Populated places
The parish contains the nation's largest city of St. John's. Other populated places include:

 Aberdeen - 
Adelin
Barrymore
 Branns Hamlet - 
 Belmont - 
Bellevue Heights - 
Belvedere - 
 Bendals - 
 Black Rock - 
Blue Waters 
Boon House - 
 Buckleys - 
 Cedar Grove - 
Cedar Valley - 
Clare Hall - 
Clarkes Hill
 Cooks Hill
 Cooks New Extension
Crosbies - 
Deanery
 Emanuel - 
 Five Islands - 
 Friars Hill - 
Gambles
 Gamble's Terrace
 Golden Grove - 
 Gray Hill
 Grays Farm
 Green Bay - 
Green Castle
Hamiltons - 
Hattons - 
Herberts - 
Hodges Bay
Jacks Hill, Antigua and Barbuda
Marble Hill
Martin Hill - 
McKinnon’s
Montclear
 Nut Grove
 Obeez
 Old Battery
 Olivers - 
Ottos
Paradise View - 
Piggott's Ville
Potters Buff - 
Potters Village - 
Prison Farm
Radio Range
 Renfrew - 
 Side Hill - 
 Skerrits
St. Claire
St. Luke - 
Soldier - 
Sutherlands - 
Sutherlands Development - 
 Tomlinson - 
Union Road
 Upper Gamble's
 Villa
 Weatherhills - 
 Woods - 
 Yeptons - 
 Yorks

Demographics 
Main Articles: Demographics of Saint John's (Antigua and Barbuda), Demographics of Saint John Parish, Antigua and Barbuda

Education
Island Academy International, the sole international school in the country, is located in the town of Buckleys within Saint John Parish. It was formerly Oliver's Estate Island Academy.

References

 
Parishes of Antigua and Barbuda
Antigua (island)